Al-Mahabah (Arabic: المحبة) is a Syrian village in the Al-Tall District of the Rif Dimashq Governorate. According to the Syria Central Bureau of Statistics (CBS), Al-Mahabah had a population of 100 in the 2004 census.

References

External links 

Populated places in Al-Tall District